Teynham Street is a hamlet in the Swale district, in the English county of Kent. It is near the village of Teynham.

References

Philip's Navigator Britain (page 93)

Borough of Swale
Hamlets in Kent